Elkin's Ferry Battlefield was the site of the Battle of Elkin's Ferry, an engagement of the Camden Expedition during the American Civil War. The  battlefield area was designated a part of the Camden Expedition Sites National Historic Landmark, made up of several of the Union expedition's key sites, on April 19, 1994.

Description
The Elkin's Ferry Battlefield is a predominantly wooded area, crossed by the Little Missouri River, and Middle and Howard Creeks, which are tributaries to its south that flow roughly from west to east. The present alignment of Nevada County Route 37 and Clark County Route 14 roughly follow the route the Union forces. The presumed ferry site is still visible as a deep cut in the river bank near the road.  The ferry was replaced by a wooden bridge in the 1920s, which was washed out sometime in the 1950s or 1960s.  The construction of Interstate 30 resulted in decreased significance of the area for transportation, and contributed to the preservation of the battlefield.  The area is also flood-prone (as it was in the 1860s), and not suitable for development.

See also
List of National Historic Landmarks in Arkansas
National Register of Historic Places listings in Clark County, Arkansas
National Register of Historic Places listings in Nevada County, Arkansas

References

External links

 Elkin's Ferry Battlefield at American Battlefield Trust

1994 establishments in Arkansas
American Civil War on the National Register of Historic Places
Battlefields of the Trans-Mississippi Theater of the American Civil War
Camden Expedition Sites National Historic Landmark
Conflict sites on the National Register of Historic Places in Arkansas
National Register of Historic Places in Clark County, Arkansas
National Register of Historic Places in Nevada County, Arkansas
Protected areas established in 1994
Little Missouri River (Arkansas)